Chen Jianchen (27 January 1906 – 16 October 1989) was a Chinese university teacher and politician. She was among the first group of women elected to the Legislative Yuan in 1948.

Biography
Chen was born in Shang county in Shaanxi. During the early phase of the Second Sino-Japanese War, she co-founded the bimonthly magazine Great Unity (大团结) and became a member of the Shaanxi Provincial Party Committee of the Kuomintang.

She was subsequently elected to the Legislative Yuan in the 1948 elections and sat on the Finance and Banking Committee, the Budget Committee and the Labour Committee. After the establishment of the People's Republic of China in 1949, she served as a deputy Minister of Justice in the East China Military and Political Committee and vice president of the Higher People's Court in Jiangsu. She was a delegate to the sixth Chinese People's Political Consultative Conference and a member of the central committee of the Revolutionary Committee of the Chinese Kuomintang.

References

1906 births
Waseda University alumni
Chinese academics
20th-century Chinese educators
20th-century Chinese women politicians
Members of the Kuomintang
Members of the 1st Legislative Yuan
Members of the Revolutionary Committee of the Chinese Kuomintang
1989 deaths